"Young Girl" is a RIAA million-selling Gold-certified single that was written, composed, and produced by Jerry Fuller and performed by Gary Puckett & The Union Gap with instrumental backing by members of "The Wrecking Crew." It was released in 1968.

The song hit No. 2 on the Billboard Hot 100 for three weeks, stuck behind "(Sittin' On) The Dock of the Bay" by Otis Redding for the first week and "Honey" by Bobby Goldsboro for the remaining two. It also hit No. 1 on the UK Singles Chart and the US Cash Box listing. It reached No. 34 on the US Easy Listening.  It reached No. 2 in South Africa.

In the UK, "Young Girl" was re-released in 1974 as part of a CBS Records series entitled "Hall of Fame Hits", and enjoyed a second UK chart run, peaking at No. 6.

Lyrics
The song is sung from the point of view of a man who has become distressed upon finding out that the girl he is with, contrary to the first impression she had made upon him, is actually younger than the legal age of consent. He is asking her to leave before things go any further: "Get out of here / before I have the time / to change my mind / 'cause I'm afraid we'll go too far."

Chart history

Weekly charts

Year-end charts

References

1968 singles
1974 singles
Gary Puckett & The Union Gap songs
Gary Lewis & the Playboys songs
Cashbox number-one singles
RPM Top Singles number-one singles
UK Singles Chart number-one singles
Irish Singles Chart number-one singles
Number-one singles in New Zealand
Columbia Records singles
Sexuality and age in fiction
Songs about teenagers
1968 songs
Songs written by Jerry Fuller
Song recordings produced by Jerry Fuller